Laufenburg (Baden) station is a railway station in the town of Laufenburg (Baden), Baden-Württemberg, Germany. The station lies on the High Rhine Railway, directly next to the river and is opposite the Swiss part of Laufenburg. The train services are operated by Deutsche Bahn.

Services 
 the following services stop at Laufenburg (Baden):

References

External links
 
 

Railway stations in Baden-Württemberg
Buildings and structures in Waldshut (district)